The 1988–89 daytime network television schedule for the three major English-language commercial broadcast networks in the United States covers the weekday and weekend daytime hours from September 1988 to August 1989.

Legend

 New series are highlighted in bold.

Schedule
 All times correspond to U.S. Eastern and Pacific Time scheduling (except for some live sports or events). Except where affiliates slot certain programs outside their network-dictated timeslots, subtract one hour for Central, Mountain, Alaska, and Hawaii-Aleutian times.
 Local schedules may differ, as affiliates have the option to pre-empt or delay network programs. Such scheduling may be limited to preemptions caused by local or national breaking news or weather coverage (which may force stations to tape delay certain programs to later timeslots) and any major sports events scheduled to air in a weekday timeslot (mainly during major holidays). Stations may air shows at other times at their preference.

Monday–Friday

ABC note: From September 19–30, 1988, Home aired for one hour, commandeering reruns of Growing Pains.

NBC note: NBC returned the 12:00 noon time slot to its affiliates beginning March 27, 1989, after Super Password finished its run three days earlier. Many NBC affiliates did not air the show in this timeslot, instead opting to air local news.  The new soap Generations was available to affiliates at noon/11:00 CT or 12:30/11:30 CT.

Saturday

Sunday

By network

ABC

Returning series
ABC Weekend Special
ABC World News This Morning
ABC World News Tonight with Peter Jennings
All My Children
Animal Crack-Ups
The Bugs Bunny and Tweety Show
The Flintstone Kids 
General Hospital
Good Morning America
Growing Pains 
The Home Show
Loving
One Life to Live
Ryan's Hope
Slimer! and the Real Ghostbusters
This Week with David Brinkley

New series
The New Adventures of Beany and Cecil
The New Adventures of Winnie the Pooh
A Pup Named Scooby-Doo

Not returning from 1987–88
The Care Bears Family 
Little Clowns of Happytown
Little Wizards
Mr. Belvedere 
My Pet Monster
Pound Puppies
Who's the Boss?

CBS

Returning series
As the World Turns
The Bold and the Beautiful
Card Sharks
CBS Evening News
CBS Morning News
CBS News Sunday Morning
CBS Storybreak
CBS This Morning
Face the Nation
Family Feud
Guiding Light
Jim Henson's Muppet Babies
Mighty Mouse: The New Adventures
Pee-wee's Playhouse
The Price Is Right
Teen Wolf 
The Young and the Restless

New series
The Adventures of Raggedy Ann and Andy
Flip!
Garfield and Friends
Hey Vern, It's Ernest!
Now You See It!
Superman
Wheel of Fortune

Not returning from 1987–88
Blackout
Dennis the Menace
Galaxy High 
Hello Kitty's Furry Tale Theater
Kidd Video 
Popeye and Son
The $25,000 Pyramid

NBC

Returning series
Adventures of the Gummi Bears
ALF
The Chipmunks
Another World
Classic Concentration 
Days of Our Lives
Fat Albert and the Cosby Kids 
Kissyfur
Meet the Press
NBC News at Sunrise
NBC Nightly News
The New Archies 
Punky Brewster 
Sale of the Century
Santa Barbara
Scrabble
The Smurfs
Super Password
Today
Wheel of Fortune
Win, Lose or Draw

New series
2 Hip 4 TV
ALF Tales
The Completely Mental Misadventures of Ed Grimley
Generations
The Golden Girls 

Not returning from 1987–88
Foofur
Jim Henson's Fraggle Rock
I'm Telling!

See also
1988-89 United States network television schedule (prime-time)
1988-89 United States network television schedule (late night)

Sources
https://web.archive.org/web/20071015122215/http://curtalliaume.com/abc_day.html
https://web.archive.org/web/20071015122235/http://curtalliaume.com/cbs_day.html
https://web.archive.org/web/20071012211242/http://curtalliaume.com/nbc_day.html

United States weekday network television schedules
1988 in American television
1989 in American television